{{Infobox rail service
| name = Chauri Chaura Express
| image= Chauri Chaura Express board.jpg
| caption = 
| type = Express
| first =
| last = 
| operator = North Eastern Railways
| start = 
| stops = 28
| end = 
| distance =     
| journey time = 14 hours 05 mins as 15003  Kanpur–Gorakhpur Chauri Chaura Express; 13 hours 20 mins as 15004  Gorakhpur–Kanpur Chauri Chaura Express  
| frequency = Daily
| class = AC 1st, AC 2 tier, AC 3 tier, Sleeper class, General Unreserved
| seating = Yes
| sleeping = Yes
| autorack =
| catering = No
| observation =       
| entertainment =
| baggage =
| other facilities= 
| stock = Standard Indian Railways coaches
| gauge = 
| el = No
| train number = 15003 / 04
| speed =  maximum  including halts.
| map = 
| map_state =
}}

The 15003 / 04 Kanpur–Gorakhpur Chauri Chaura Express''' is an Express train belonging to Indian Railways – North Eastern Railway zone that runs between  &  in India.

It operates as train number 15003 from Kanpur Anwarganj to Gorakhpur Junction and as train number 15004 in the reverse direction, serving the state of Uttar Pradesh.

It is named after the town of Chauri Chaura in Uttar Pradesh which is famous for the Chauri Chaura incident of 1922.

Coaches

The 15003 / 04 Kanpur Anwarganj–Gorakhpur Chauri Chaura Express has 1 AC Ist cum AC II Tier,  1 AC II tier, 4 AC III tier, 6 Sleeper class, 6 General Unreserved & 2 SLR (Seating cum Luggage Rake) coaches. It does not carry a pantry car .
 
As is customary with most train services in India, coach composition may be amended at the discretion of Indian Railways depending on demand.

Service

Routeing

Traction

As the route is now fully electrified, a Kanpur-based WAP-7 hauls the train for its entire journey. Earlier it used to be hauled by a Diesel Locomotive.

Operation

The 15003 Kanpur Anwarganj–Gorakhpur Chauri Chaura Express runs from Kanpur Anwarganj on a daily basis reaching Gorakhpur Junction the next day.

The 15004 Gorakhpur–Kanpur Anwarganj Chauri Chaura Express runs from Gorakhpur Junction on a daily basis reaching Kanpur Anwarganj the next day.

Incidents

 On 25 October 2010, a person was shot dead on board the train 
 On 19 April 2008, the train suffered a derailment without suffering any casualties .
The train occasionally gets cancelled during the winter months .

References 

 http://www.holidayiq.com/railways/chauri-chaura-express-15003-train.html
 https://web.archive.org/web/20140911002417/http://www.saharasamay.com/regional-news/uttar-pradesh-news/676476053/man-shot-dead-in-chauri-chaura-express.html
 http://news.oneindia.in/2008/04/19/one-bogie-of-chauri-chaura-express-derails-1208613842.html
 
 https://www.youtube.com/watch?v=lW3jv5k1nZs

External links

Trains from Kanpur
Passenger trains originating from Gorakhpur
Named passenger trains of India
Express trains in India